Eltje Malzbender (born 15 May 1962) is a German-born New Zealand para-cyclist. She won two gold medals – one in the Tricycle 1 Road Race event, the other in the Tricycle 1 Time Trial event – at the 2019 UCI Para-cycling Road World Championships in  Emmen, Netherlands.

References

External links
 

1962 births
Living people
New Zealand female cyclists
German emigrants to New Zealand
Paralympic cyclists of New Zealand
Cyclists at the 2020 Summer Paralympics